Quincy Davis (born August 27, 1977 in Grand Rapids, Michigan) is a jazz drummer who has recorded with Tom Harrell, Benny Green, Hank Jones, Kurt Elling, The Clayton Brothers, Gerald Clayton, Russell Malone, Frank Wess, Eric Lewis, Junko Onishi, Ernestine Anderson, Vincent Gardner, and Randy Napoleon.

Biography
Davis grew up in a musical family in Grand Rapids, Michigan. His brother is pianist Xavier Davis. He often played with his brother in their home. In grade school, he also picked up the trumpet and tuba. Near the end of his high school career, he attended the Interlochen Arts Academy in northern Michigan. There he played jazz in a group setting and studied classical percussion and trap-set drumming.

Discography

As a leader
 2013 Songs in the Key of Q

As sideman

With Tom Harrell
 2002 Live at the Village Vanguard
 2003 Wise Children

With Vincent Gardner
 2006 Elbow Room
 2007 The Good Book Chapter 1
 2008 Vin-Slidin' 

With Aaron Diehl
 2011 Live at Live at the Players
 2015 Space Time Continuum

With Sachal Vasandani
 2007 Eyes Wide Open
 2009 We Move

With Peter Zak
 2008 Seed of Sin
 2009 Blues on the Corner

With Randy Napoleon
 2003 Enjoy the Moment
 2006 Between Friends
 2011 The Jukebox Crowd

With David Gibson
 2006 G-Rays 2009 A Little Somethin 2010 End of the TunnelWith Jared Gold'''
 2010 All Wrapped Up 2011 Golden Child

With James Danderfer
 2004 Run with It 2015 Time and Tide 2020 All the Flowers

With Young Joo Song
 2006 Falling Free 2008 JourneyWith Greg Glassman 2002 Onward and Upward
 2007 Into the WildWith others'''
 2006 Lost in New York, Matt Ray
 2006 Ballade Pour Adeline, Adam Birnbaum
 2007 And So Am I, Darmon Meador
 2008 From the Heart, Bobby Watson
 2008 Purple Butterfly, Daniela Schaechter
 2008 Ballads - All Night, Marcus Printup
 2008 Lite Blue''', Takuji Yamada
 2009 Impromptu, Ted Rosenthal
 2009 My Foolish Heart, Maya Hatch
 2009 Introducing Takao Iwaki, Takao Iwaki
 2010 Out of the World, Ted Rosenthal
 2010 Keystone, Dave Stryker
 2010 See the Pyramid, Walt Weiskopf
 2010 Little Echo', Ken Fowser
 2013 Some Other Time, Ayako Shirasaki
 2014 Leslie Odom Jr., Leslie Odom Jr.
 2015 Debut: Noriko Ueda Trio, Noriko Ueda
 2015 Alto Gusto: Live at the Yardbird Suite, P.J. Perry
 2017 Halcyon', Will Bonness
 2017 Jazz Standards, Jon Gordon
 2019 Elegant Traveler, Jocelyn Gould
 2020 Rise Up Detroit, Xavier Davis

References

External links
 Winnipeg Free Press article

American jazz drummers
Living people
1977 births
20th-century American drummers
American male drummers
21st-century American drummers
20th-century American male musicians
21st-century American male musicians
American male jazz musicians